Floyd Robert Donald Smith (born May 16, 1935, in Perth, Ontario) is a Canadian former professional ice hockey centre and coach.

Biography 
Smith grew up in Galt, Ontario, playing junior hockey with the Galt Black Hawks. He made his National Hockey League debut for the Boston Bruins, playing 3 games with the team in 1955, but he was mostly mired in the minors during the early portion of his career. He played 23 games with Boston over the next two seasons, while serving as a significant contributor on the Hershey Bears club. Smith then spent five years with the New York Rangers organization, reaching the NHL for a 29-game stint in 1961. During this period, he was a dominant force with the Springfield Indians, scoring 82 points in 71 games in 1960.

In 1963, Smith finally earned a chance to become an NHL regular after being acquired by the Detroit Red Wings. He scored an NHL career-high 49 points during the 1965–66 season. He was part of a six-player blockbuster transaction in which he was traded along with Norm Ullman and Paul Henderson from the Red Wings to the Toronto Maple Leafs for Frank Mahovlich, Pete Stemkowski and Garry Unger on March 4, 1968. The Maple Leafs and Red Wings were in fifth and sixth place respectively at the bottom of the East Division standings at the time of the deal. He was selected by the Buffalo Sabres during the 1970 expansion draft and served as the team's first captain.

Smith became an assistant coach with the Sabres in 1972. The next year, he was hired as head coach of the team's top farm club, the AHL's Cincinnati Swords. He won a Calder Cup in the first of his two years with the team. In 1974, he became Buffalo's head coach, leading the team to a loss in the Stanley Cup Final in his first year. However, the Sabres were eliminated in the second round the next two years, and he was fired at the end of the 1976-77 season.

He also coached the World Hockey Association's Cincinnati Stingers for the 1976–77 season and was Toronto Maple Leafs coach for the first 68 games of 1979–80 until being injured in a car accident on March 14, 1980, rendering him unable to fulfill his duties as coach for the remainder of the season. He remained with the Leafs as a scout until being promoted to general manager, a position he held for the 1989–90 and 1990–91 seasons.

Smith resides in southern Erie County, New York.

Career statistics

Coaching record

References

External links

1935 births
Boston Bruins players
Buffalo Sabres captains
Buffalo Sabres coaches
Buffalo Sabres players
Canadian ice hockey centres
Cincinnati Stingers
Detroit Red Wings players
Galt Black Hawks players
Hershey Bears players
Living people
New York Rangers players
People from Perth, Ontario
Pittsburgh Hornets players
Springfield Indians players
Toronto Maple Leafs coaches
Toronto Maple Leafs executives
Toronto Maple Leafs players
Toronto Maple Leafs scouts
Canadian ice hockey coaches